Adrenalin Quarry is a family-owned visitor attraction and adventure park in Menheniot, Cornwall, United Kingdom. It opened in Easter 2009, on the site of an old flooded quarry and offers five rides: The Aquapark, The Zip, The Giant Swing, Axe throwing and Karting . As an area of special scientific interest, the attraction concentrates on low-carbon gravity rides which have minimal or zero impact on the local environment. It has been featured in a number of British newspapers, including The Sunday Times and The Guardian  as a top attraction to visit in Cornwall.

Origins & History 

 Clicker Trikes 1986-89
 Quad Centre 1989-92
 Kartworld 
 Hoverworld 2009 - 2010
 Adrenalin Quarry 2009 - Current

Adrenalin Quarry was formerly known as Clicker Tor Quarry. (It's still called that locally.) Worked for Blue Elvin rock from 1932 to 1969, it was an important business providing much-needed employment and a boost to South-East Cornwall's local economy. After the closure the quarry grew derelict and was flooded to a depth of 22m, until in 1986, Clicker Trikes, now Kartworld, opened its doors to the public. In January, 2009, under the guidance of current owner, Will Sneyd, the first posts went in at the western end of the lake to build the launch platform for Adrenalin Quarry's first ride - The Zip. Adrenalin Quarry opened in Easter 2009 and has added new rides and facilities each year since then. In Easter 2018 the Aqua Park opened, a large 'total wipeout' style inflatable assault course on the lake of the flooded quarry, taking the total amount of activities at the attraction up to 5.

Rides

References 

 https://www.beachretreats.co.uk/explore/best-places-for-kids/adrenalin-quarry/
 http://www.wedmagazine.co.uk/wedding-at-adrenalin-quarry.html
 https://www.theguardian.com/travel/2016/jul/15/take-the-kids-zipwires-adrenaline-quarry-cornwall
 https://www.independent.co.uk/travel/uk/trail-of-the-unexpected-adrenalin-quarry-2178930.html
 https://www.cornwalllive.com/whats-on/family-kids/total-wipeout-style-water-park-1429638

External links 

 Website.  adrenalinquarry.co.uk

Buildings and structures in Cornwall
Tourist attractions in Cornwall
Entertainment in Cornwall
Amusement parks in England
Zip lines
2009 establishments in England
Adventure parks